Emotion classification, the means by which one may distinguish or contrast one emotion from another, is a contested issue in emotion research and in affective science. Researchers have approached the classification of emotions from one of two fundamental viewpoints:

 that emotions are discrete and fundamentally different constructs
 that emotions can be characterized on a dimensional basis in groupings

Emotions as discrete categories 

In discrete emotion theory, all humans are thought to have an innate set of basic emotions that are cross-culturally recognizable. These basic emotions are described as "discrete" because they are believed to be distinguishable by an individual's facial expression and biological processes. Theorists have conducted studies to determine which emotions are basic. A popular example is Paul Ekman and his colleagues' cross-cultural study of 1992, in which they concluded that the six basic emotions are anger, disgust, fear, happiness, sadness, and surprise. Ekman explains that there are particular characteristics attached to each of these emotions, allowing them to be expressed in varying degrees. Each emotion acts as a discrete category rather than an individual emotional state.

Basicality debate 

Humans' subjective experience is that emotions are clearly recognizable in ourselves and others. This apparent ease of recognition has led to the identification of a number of emotions that are said to be basic, and universal among all people. However, a debate among experts has questioned this understanding of what emotions are. There has been recent discussion of the progression on the different views of emotion over the years.

On "basic emotion" accounts, activation of an emotion, such as anger, sadness, or fear, is "triggered" by the brain's appraisal of a stimulus or event with respect to the perceiver's goals or survival. In particular, the function, expression, and meaning of different emotions are hypothesized to be biologically distinct from one another. A theme common to many basic emotions theories is that there should be functional signatures that distinguish different emotions: we should be able to tell what emotion a person is feeling by looking at his or her brain activity and/or physiology. Furthermore, knowledge of what the person is seeing or the larger context of the eliciting event should not be necessary to deduce what the person is feeling from observing the biological signatures.

On "constructionist" accounts, the emotion a person feels in response to a stimulus or event is "constructed" from more elemental biological and psychological ingredients. Two hypothesized ingredients are "core affect" (characterized by, e.g., hedonic valence and physiological arousal) and conceptual knowledge (such as the semantic meaning of the emotion labels themselves, e.g., the word "anger"). A theme common to many constructionist theories is that different emotions do not have specific locations in the nervous system or distinct physiological signatures, and that context is central to the emotion a person feels because of the accessibility of different concepts afforded by different contexts.

Semantically distinct emotions 

Eugene Bann proposed a theory that people transmit their understanding of emotions through the language they use that surrounds mentioned emotion keywords. He posits that the more distinct language is used to express a certain emotion, then the more distinct the perception (including proprioception) of that emotion is, and thus more basic. This allows us to select the dimensions best representing the entire spectrum of emotion. Coincidentally, it was found that Ekman's (1972) basic emotion set, arguably the most frequently used for classifying emotions, is the most semantically distinct.

Dimensional models of emotion 

For both theoretical and practical reasons researchers define emotions according to one or more dimensions. In his philosophical treatise, The Passions of the Soul, Descartes defines and investigates the six primary passions (wonder, love, hate, desire, joy, and sadness). Wilhelm Max Wundt, the father of modern psychology, proposed in 1897 that emotions can be described by three dimensions: "pleasurable versus unpleasurable", "arousing or subduing" and "strain or relaxation". In 1954 Harold Schlosberg named three dimensions of emotion: "pleasantness–unpleasantness", "attention–rejection" and "level of activation".

Dimensional models of emotion attempt to conceptualize human emotions by defining where they lie in two or three dimensions. Most dimensional models incorporate valence and arousal or intensity dimensions. Dimensional models of emotion suggest that a common and interconnected neurophysiological system is responsible for all affective states. These models contrast theories of basic emotion, which propose that different emotions arise from separate neural systems. Several dimensional models of emotion have been developed, though there are just a few that remain as the dominant models currently accepted by most. The two-dimensional models that are most prominent are the circumplex model, the vector model, and the Positive Activation – Negative Activation (PANA) model.

Circumplex model 

The circumplex model of emotion was developed by James Russell. This model suggests that emotions are distributed in a two-dimensional circular space, containing arousal and valence dimensions. Arousal represents the vertical axis and valence represents the horizontal axis, while the center of the circle represents a neutral valence and a medium level of arousal. In this model, emotional states can be represented at any level of valence and arousal, or at a neutral level of one or both of these factors. Circumplex models have been used most commonly to test stimuli of emotion words, emotional facial expressions, and affective states.

Russell and Lisa Feldman Barrett describe their modified circumplex model as representative of core affect, or the most elementary feelings that are not necessarily directed toward anything. Different prototypical emotional episodes, or clear emotions that are evoked or directed by specific objects, can be plotted on the circumplex, according to their levels of arousal and pleasure.

Vector model 

The vector model of emotion appeared in 1992. This two-dimensional model consists of vectors that point in two directions, representing a "boomerang" shape. The model assumes that there is always an underlying arousal dimension, and that valence determines the direction in which a particular emotion lies. For example, a positive valence would shift the emotion up the top vector and a negative valence would shift the emotion down the bottom vector. In this model, high arousal states are differentiated by their valence, whereas low arousal states are more neutral and are represented near the meeting point of the vectors. Vector models have been most widely used in the testing of word and picture stimuli.

Positive activation – negative activation (PANA) model 

The positive activation – negative activation (PANA) or "consensual" model of emotion, originally created by Watson and Tellegen in 1985, suggests that positive affect and negative affect are two separate systems. Similar to the vector model, states of higher arousal tend to be defined by their valence, and states of lower arousal tend to be more neutral in terms of valence. In the PANA model, the vertical axis represents low to high positive affect and the horizontal axis represents low to high negative affect. The dimensions of valence and arousal lay at a 45-degree rotation over these axes.

Plutchik's model 

Robert Plutchik offers a three-dimensional model that is a hybrid of both basic-complex categories and dimensional theories. It arranges emotions in concentric circles where inner circles are more basic and outer circles more complex. Notably, outer circles are also formed by blending the inner circle emotions. Plutchik's model, as Russell's, emanates from a circumplex representation, where emotional words were plotted based on similarity. There are numerous emotions, which appear in several intensities and can be combined in various ways to form emotional "dyads".

PAD emotional state model 

The PAD emotional state model is a psychological model developed by Albert Mehrabian and James A. Russell to describe and measure emotional states. PAD uses three numerical dimensions to represent all emotions. The PAD dimensions are Pleasure, Arousal and Dominance.

The Pleasure-Displeasure Scale measures how pleasant an emotion may be. For instance both anger and fear are unpleasant emotions, and score high on the displeasure scale. However joy is a pleasant emotion.

The Arousal-Nonarousal Scale measures how energized or soporific one feels. It is not the intensity of the emotion—for grief and depression can be low arousal intense feelings. While both anger and rage are unpleasant emotions, rage has a higher intensity or a higher arousal state. However boredom, which is also an unpleasant state, has a low arousal value.

The Dominance-Submissiveness Scale represents the controlling and dominant nature of the emotion. For instance while both fear and anger are unpleasant emotions, anger is a dominant emotion, while fear is a submissive emotion.

Criticisms

Cultural considerations 

Ethnographic and cross-cultural studies of emotions have shown the variety of ways in which emotions differ with cultures. Because of these differences, many cross-cultural psychologists and anthropologists challenge the idea of universal classifications of emotions altogether.

Cultural differences have been observed in the way in which emotions are valued, expressed, and regulated. The social norms for emotions, such as the frequency with or circumstances in which they are expressed, also vary drastically. For example, the demonstration of anger is encouraged by Kaluli people, but condemned by Utku Inuit. The largest piece of evidence that disputes the universality of emotions is language. Differences within languages directly correlate to differences in emotion taxonomy. Languages differ in that they categorize emotions based on different components. Some may categorize by event types whereas others categorize by action readiness. Furthermore, emotion taxonomies vary due to the differing implications emotions have in different languages. That being said, not all English words have equivalents in all other languages and vice versa, indicating that there are words for emotions present in some languages but not in others. Emotions such as the schadenfreude in German and saudade in Portuguese are commonly expressed in emotions in their respective languages, but lack an English equivalent. Some languages do not differentiate between emotions that are considered to be the basic emotions in English. For instance, certain African languages have one word for both anger and sadness, and others for shame and fear. There is ethnographic evidence that even challenges the universality of the category "emotions" because certain cultures lack a specific word relating to the English word "emotions".

Lists of emotions 
Humans experience emotion, with evidence used that they influence action, thoughts and behavior. Emotions are categorized into various affects, which correspond to the current situation. An affect is the range of feeling experienced. Both positive and negative emotions are needed in our daily lives.

Many theories of emotion have been proposed, with contrasting views.

Basic emotions 

 William James in 1890 proposed four basic emotions: fear, grief, love, and rage, based on bodily involvement.
 Paul Ekman identified six basic emotions: anger, disgust, fear, happiness, sadness and surprise. Wallace V. Friesen and Phoebe C. Ellsworth worked with him on the same basic structure. The emotions can be linked to facial expressions. In the 1990s, Ekman proposed an expanded list of basic emotions, including a range of positive and negative emotions that are not all encoded in facial muscles. The newly included emotions are: Amusement, Contempt, Contentment, Embarrassment, Excitement, Guilt, Pride in achievement, Relief, Satisfaction, Sensory pleasure, and Shame.
 Richard and Bernice Lazarus in 1996 expanded the list to 15 emotions: aesthetic experience, anger, anxiety, compassion, depression, envy, fright, gratitude, guilt, happiness, hope, jealousy, love, pride, relief, sadness, and shame, in the book Passion and Reason.
 Researchers at University of California, Berkeley identified 27 categories of emotion: admiration, adoration, aesthetic appreciation, amusement, anger, anxiety, awe, awkwardness, boredom, calmness, confusion, craving, disgust, empathic pain, entrancement, excitement, fear, horror, interest, joy, nostalgia, relief, romance, sadness, satisfaction, sexual desire and surprise. This was based on 2185 short videos intended to elicit a certain emotion. These were then modeled onto a "map" of emotions.

Contrasting basic emotions 
A 2009 review of theories of emotion identifies and contrasts fundamental emotions according to three key criteria for mental experiences that:

 have a strongly motivating subjective quality like pleasure or pain;
 are a response to some event or object that is either real or imagined;
 motivate particular kinds of behavior.

The combination of these attributes distinguishes emotions from sensations, feelings and moods.

HUMAINE's proposal for EARL 
The emotion annotation and representation language (EARL) proposed by the Human-Machine Interaction Network on Emotion (HUMAINE) classifies 48 emotions.
Negative and forceful
Anger
Annoyance
Contempt
Disgust
Irritation
Negative and not in control
Anxiety
Embarrassment
Fear
Helplessness
Powerlessness
Worry
Negative thoughts
Pride
Doubt
Envy
Frustration
Guilt
Shame
Negative and passive
Boredom
Despair
Disappointment
Hurt
Sadness
Agitation
Stress
Shock
Tension
Positive and lively
Amusement
Delight
Elation
Excitement
Happiness
Joy
Pleasure
Caring
Affection
Empathy
Friendliness
Love
Positive thoughts
Courage
Hope
Humility
Satisfaction
Trust
Quiet positive
Calmness
Contentment
Relaxation
Relief
Serenity
Reactive
Interest
Politeness
Surprise

Parrott's emotions by groups 
A tree-structured list of emotions was described in Shaver et al. (1987), and also featured in Parrott (2001).

Plutchik's wheel of emotions 
In 1980, Robert Plutchik diagrammed a wheel of eight emotions: joy, trust, fear, surprise, sadness, disgust, anger and anticipation, inspired by his Ten Postulates. Plutchik also theorized twenty-four "Primary", "Secondary", and "Tertiary" dyads (feelings composed of two emotions). The wheel emotions can be paired in four groups:

 Primary dyad = one petal apart = Love = Joy + Trust
 Secondary dyad = two petals apart = Envy = Sadness + Anger
 Tertiary dyad = three petals apart = Shame = Fear + Disgust
 Opposite emotions = four petals apart = Anticipation ∉ Surprise

There are also triads, emotions formed from 3 primary emotions, though Plutchik never describes in any detail what the triads might be. This leads to a combination of 24 dyads and 32 triads, making 56 emotions at 1 intensity level. Emotions can be mild or intense; for example, distraction is a mild form of surprise, and rage is an intense form of anger. The kinds of relation between each pair of emotions are:

Similar emotions in the wheel are adjacent to each other. Anger, Anticipation, Joy, and Trust are positive in valence, while Fear, Surprise, Sadness, and Disgust are negative in valence. Anger is classified as a "positive" emotion because it involves "moving toward" a goal, while surprise is negative because it is a violation of someone's territory. The emotion dyads each have half-opposites and exact opposites:

Six emotion axes 
MIT researchers  published a paper titled "An Affective Model of Interplay Between Emotions and Learning: Reengineering Educational Pedagogy—Building a Learning Companion" that lists six axes of emotions with different opposite emotions, and different emotions coming from ranges.

They also made a model labeling phases of learning emotions.

The Book of Human Emotions 
Tiffany Watt Smith listed 154 different worldwide emotions and feelings.

A
Abhiman
Acedia
Amae
Ambiguphobia
Anger
Anticipation
Anxiety 
Apathy
L’appel du vide
Awumbuk
B
Bafflement
Basorexia
Befuddlement
Bewilderment 
Boredom
Brabant
Broodiness 
C
Calm
Carefree
Cheerfulness
Cheesed (off)
Claustrophobia 
Collywobbles, the 
Comfort 
Compassion
Compersion
Confidence 
Contempt 
Contentment 
Courage 
Curiosity 
Cyberchondria
D
Delight 
Dépaysement
Desire
Despair
Disappear, the desire to 
Disappointment 
Disgruntlement
Disgust
Dismay
Dolce far niente
Dread
E
Ecstasy
Embarrassment 
Empathy 
Envy
Euphoria 
Exasperation 
Excitement
F
Fear
Feeling good (about yourself) 
Formal feeling, a 
Fraud, feeling like a 
Frustration
G
Gezelligheid
Gladsomeness 
Glee 
Gratitude 
Greng jai
Grief 
Guilt 
H
Han
Happiness
Hatred
Heebie-Jeebies, the
Hiraeth
Hoard, the urge to
Homefulness
Homesickness
Hopefulness
Huff, in a 
Humble, feeling
Humiliation
Hunger
Hwyl
I
Ijirashi 
Ilinx
Impatience
Indignation
Inhabitiveness
Insulted, feeling
Irritation
J
Jealousy
Joy
K
Kaukokaipuu
L
Liget
Litost
Loneliness
Love
M
Malu
Man
Matutolypea
Mehameha
Melancholy
Miffed, a bit
Mono no aware
Morbid curiosity
N
Nakhes
Nginyiwarrarringu
Nostalgia
O
Oime
Overwhelmed, feeling
P
Panic
Paranoia
Perversity
Peur des espaces
Philoprogenitiveness
Pique, a fit of
Pity
Postal, going
Pride
Pronoia
R
Rage
Regret
Relief
Reluctance 
Remorse
Reproachfulness
Resentment
Ringxiety
Rivalry
Road rage
Ruinenlust
S
Sadness
Satisfaction
Saudade
Schadenfreude
Self-pity
Shame
Shock
Smugness
Song
Surprise
Suspicion
T
Technostress
Terror
Torschlusspanik
Toska
Triumph
V
Vengefulness
Vergüenza ajena
Viraha
Vulnerability
W
Wanderlust 
Warm glow
Wonder
Worry
Z
Żal

Mapping facial expressions 
Scientists map twenty-one different facial emotions expanded from Paul Ekman's six basic emotions of anger, disgust, fear, happiness, sadness, and surprise:

Atlas of emotions 
The Dalai Lama made a website based on the emotions of enjoyment, disgust, anger, fear and sadness with the help of Paul Ekman. The emotions were similar to the ones found in Inside Out, a film that Paul Ekman advised.

Emotion and stress 
Emotions and stress are connected, so stressful situations produce emotion. Environments that make stress also make emotions.

Emotion Dynamics 
Researchers distinguish several emotion dynamics, most commonly how intense (mean level), variable (fluctuations), inert (temporal dependency), instable (magnitude of moment-to-moment fluctuations), or differentiated someone's emotions are (the specificity of granularity of emotions), and whether and how an emotion augments or blunts other emotions. Meta-analytic reviews show systematic developmental changes in emotion dynamics throughout childhood and adolescence and substantial between-person differences.

See also 

 Aesthetic emotions
 Affect measures
 Affective neuroscience
 Emotion and memory
 List of virtues
 Mood (psychology)
 Moral emotions
 Social emotions

Bibliography 

 Ekman, P. (1972). Universals and cultural differences in facial expression of emotion. In J. Cole (Ed.), Nebraska Symposium on Motivation. Lincoln, Nebraska: University of Nebraska Press: pp. 207–283.
 
 Ekman, P. (1999). Basic Emotions. In T. Dalgleish and T. Power (Eds.) The Handbook of Cognition and Emotion Pp. 45–60. Sussex, U.K.: John Wiley & Sons, Ltd.
 
 

 Prinz, J. (2004). Gut Reactions: A Perceptual Theory of Emotions. Oxford: Oxford University Press.

Notes and references 

Emotion